Mayaro is the name of a county on southeastern Trinidad island, in Trinidad and Tobago.

History
The "Mayaro District" was the first area of settlement on the east coast.  Many estates were granted to French planters who settled Trinidad in the late 18th century.  No roads crossed the island and the area was only accessible by steamer until the late 19th century.

Geography
The name Mayaro is applied to several villages along the coast.  The county of Mayaro occupies a large area of southeastern Trinidad, but the name is usually only applied to the coastal strip.  County Mayaro is divided into two wards: Trinity and Guayaguayare.

Along this strip a number of villages exist to which the name Mayaro is generally applied.  From north to south these are: Kernaham/Cascadou, Ortoire, St. Joseph, Beau Sejour, Plaisance, Pierreville, Beaumont, St. Ann's, Radix, Ste. Marguerite, Lagon Doux, Grand Lagoon and Lagon Palmiste.  Beyond that are several small villages and then the town of Guayaguayare. 

Mayaro falls under the jurisdiction of the Rio Claro–Mayaro Regional Corporation. Until 1990 it was administered together with the neighbouring county of Nariva by the Nariva–Mayaro County Council.

Economy
Mayaro is also associated with oil production - most of Trinidad's oil and natural gas production comes from offshore oil fields to the east of Mayaro. The major producer is BP Trinidad & Tobago (bpTT), together with BHP. Onshore oil production is under the control of Petrotrin, although a considerable area has been farmed out to small independent oil producers.

See also
 Mayaro Bay
 Ortoire River

References 
 Anthony, Michael. 2002. Where's Mayaro? Sunday Express, 14 July 2002.

External links
 Mayaro.com: Mayaro Community Blog
 Mayarobeach.com: photos of Mayaro Beach

Counties of Trinidad and Tobago
Trinidad (island)
Former counties